Mohammed al-Mahdi al-Fasi also known as Abu Isa Abu Abdallah Mohammed al-Mahdi ibn Ahmad ibn Ali ibn Yusuf al-Fihri al-Fasi was a well-known mystic, biographer and historian from Fes. A member of the prominent al-Fasi family. He was born in Ksar al-Kebir on May 17, 1624 and died 20 February 1698. He was buried in the mausoleum of his great grandfather Abu l-Mahasin Yusuf al-Fasi.

He was the author of the following works on mysticism:
Three commentaries on the Dala'il al-Khayrat
Mumti al-asma fi dhikr al-Jazuli wa at-Tabba'a wa ma lahuma min al-atba (on Muhammad al-Jazuli and Abdelaziz al-Tebaa)
Al-Ilma bi-bad man lam yudkar fi-Mumti al-asma
Mohammed al-Mahdi was particularly interested in the history of mysticism in Morocco since Mohammed al-Jazuli and his pupil al-Tabba up to the end of the 17th century. Parallel to that history he retraces the development of the Sadilite school and its affiliate founded by Ahmed Zarruq.

Al-Mahdi wrote the following biographical works, on his great grandfather Abu l-Mahasin Yusuf al-Fasi:
Al-Gawahir as-Safiyya min al-Mahasin al-Yusufiyya 
Rawdat al-mahasin az-zahiyya bi-maatir as-Sayh Abi-l-Mahsin al-Bahiyya

On the traditions of the people of Fes he wrote:
Al-Arf al-asi fi-l-urf al-Fasi

References

 Évariste Lévi-Provençal, Les Historiens du Chorfa, Essai sur la littérature historique et biographique au Maroc, du XVIe au XXe siècle, (1922)

Moroccan Sufi writers
Moroccan biographers
17th-century Moroccan historians
People from Ksar el-Kebir
People from Fez, Morocco
17th-century Arabs